Fidan Aliti (born 3 October 1993) is a professional footballer who plays as a centre-back for Zürich. Born in Switzerland, he originally represented Albania at the international level, before switching in 2017 to represent Kosovo.

Club career

Early career and Luzern
Aliti is a product of various Swiss youth teams such as Basel, Concordia Basel and Old Boys. On 9 February 2014, he made his debut with Luzern in a 2–1 away defeat against Thun after coming on as a substitute at 77th minute in place of Claudio Lustenberger.

Sheriff Tiraspol
On 3 September 2015, Aliti joined Moldovan National Division side Sheriff Tiraspol. On 13 September 2015, he made his debut in a 1–1 home draw against Dinamo-Auto Tiraspol after coming on as a substitute at 33rd minute in place of Mihajlo Cakic.

Slaven Belupo
On 2 September 2016, Aliti joined Croatian First Football League side Slaven Belupo, on a two-year contract. On 11 September 2016, he made his debut in a 3–2 home defeat against Lokomotiva after being named in the starting line-up.

Skënderbeu Korçë

2017–18 season
On 31 August 2017, Aliti completed a transfer to Skënderbeu Korçë by signing for the next three seasons and received squad number 6 for the 2017–18 season. He made his debut in a 8–0 thrashing away win in the first round of 2017–18 Albanian Cup against Adriatiku Mamurras after being named in the starting line-up. He made his first Albanian Superliga appearance on 18 September after being named in the starting line-up in a 1–1 away draw against Kamza.

Aliti in the group stage of 2017–18 UEFA Europa League made six appearances, three of them as starter and collecting 374 minutes as Skënderbeu Korçë was eliminated. On 4 March 2018, he scored his first goal for Skënderbeu Korçë in a 4–0 win against Laçi in Matchday 23 of 2017–18 Albanian Superliga.

Aliti concluded the first season by making 30 league appearances and helping Skënderbeu Korçë to win the title for the 8th time, he in the cup played seven times as the tournament ended in conquest, meaning that Skënderbeu Korçë has achieved the domestic double for the first time in history.

2018–19 season
On 12 August 2018, Aliti commenced his second season with the club by winning the 2018 Albanian Supercup against Laçi and he scoring the equalizer with a header in the second half in an eventual 3–2 win at Selman Stërmasi Stadium.

Kalmar
On 3 February 2019, Aliti joined Allsvenskan side Kalmar, on a four-year contract.

FC Zürich (loan)
In October 2020, Aliti was loaned to Swiss Super League side FC Zürich.

FC Zürich
In March 2021, FC Zürich signed Aliti to a permanent contract. On 27 May 2022, Zürich announced that Aliti had signed a new contract to keep him with the club through summer 2025.

International career

Albania
On 20 May 2014, Aliti received a call-up from Albania for the friendly matches against Romania, Hungary and San Marino. On 31 May 2014, he made his debut with Albania in a friendly match against Romania after coming on as a substitute at 79th minute in place of Ansi Agolli.

Kosovo
On 4 November 2016, Aliti decided to represent Kosovo at senior international level and he is the first player that comes from the Preševo Valley. On 7 November 2016, he received a call-up from Kosovo for a 2018 FIFA World Cup qualification match against Turkey. On 11 June 2017, Aliti made his debut with Kosovo in a 2018 FIFA World Cup qualification match against Turkey after being named in the starting line-up.

Career statistics

Club

International

Honours
Sheriff Tiraspol
Moldovan National Division: 2015–16, 2016–17
Moldovan Cup: 2015–16

Skënderbeu Korçë
Albanian Superliga: 2017–18
Albanian Cup: 2017–18
Albanian Supercup: 2018

References

External links
 
 Fidan Aliti at the Albanian Football Association

1993 births
Living people
Sportspeople from Basel-Landschaft
Swiss people of Albanian descent
Swiss men's footballers
Kosovan footballers
Albanian footballers
Association football defenders
FC Concordia Basel players
FC Basel players
BSC Old Boys players
FC Luzern players
FC Sheriff Tiraspol players
NK Slaven Belupo players
KF Skënderbeu Korçë players
Kalmar FF players
FC Zürich players
Swiss Super League players
Swiss Promotion League players
Swiss 1. Liga (football) players
Moldovan Super Liga players
Croatian Football League players
Kategoria Superiore players
Allsvenskan players
Kosovo international footballers
Albania international footballers
Kosovan expatriate footballers
Expatriate footballers in Switzerland
Expatriate footballers in Moldova
Kosovan expatriate sportspeople in Moldova
Expatriate footballers in Croatia
Kosovan expatriate sportspeople in Croatia
Expatriate footballers in Albania
Kosovan expatriate sportspeople in Albania
Expatriate footballers in Sweden
Kosovan expatriate sportspeople in Sweden
Dual internationalists (football)